Juan Paredes may refer to:

 Juan Paredes (boxer) (born 1953), Mexican boxer
 Juan Paredes (activist) (1954–1975), Basque separatist and nationalist
 Juan Ángel Paredes (born 1979), Paraguayan football striker
 Juan Paredes (footballer, born 1984), Guatemalan football goalkeeper
 Juan Carlos Paredes (born 1987), Ecuadorian football right-back
 Juan Vicente Paredes Torrealba (fl. 2013–1015), Venezuelan diplomat